"Don't Let Go" is a single by English new wave band Wang Chung. It was released as the first single from their 1984 album Points on the Curve in Canada and the US in February 1984, peaking at number 26 and number 38 on those countries' respective pop singles charts. In the UK, "Don't Let Go" was the third single from the album, released in April 1984, and peaked at number 81. The song also reached number 49 on the U.S. Billboard Mainstream Rock Tracks and number one the Dance Club Songs chart.

It was also a song featured in the action-adventure game Grand Theft Auto: Vice City Stories (2006).

Track listing
7" Geffen / 7-29377 (US)
"Don't Let Go" (Single Version) – 3:24
 "There Is a Nation" – 3:37

12" Geffen / A 4272 (UK)
 "Don't Let Go" (Special Version) – 7:11
 "Ornamental Elephant" – 3:57

Charts

References

External links

1984 singles
Wang Chung (band) songs
Songs written by Jack Hues
Songs written by Nick Feldman
Song recordings produced by Ross Cullum
Song recordings produced by Chris Hughes (record producer)
1984 songs
Geffen Records singles